Jan Paweł Matuszyński (born 23 April 1984, Katowice) is a Polish film director and a producer of documentary films.

Life
In 2012, he graduated in Film and Television Directing at the Krzysztof Kieślowski Film School in Katowice. In 2014, he was awarded the Silver George Award at the Moscow Film Festival for his documentary film Deep Love. 

In 2016, he won the Golden Lions award at the 41st Gdynia Film Festival for Ostatnia rodzina (The Last Family), a film telling the story of artist Zdzisław Beksiński, starring Andrzej Seweryn (awarded the Silver Leopard for that role at the Locarno Film Festival) and Dawid Ogrodnik. In 2016, he was awarded the Paszport Polityki Award in the film category for Ostatnia rodzina. 

His latest film Żeby nie było śladów (Leave No Traces) entered the main competition at the 78th Venice International Film Festival.

Filmography
Afterparty, etude, 2009
Amisze znad Wisły, documentary, 2010
Niebo, documentary, 2011
Offline, short film, 2012
Deep Love, documentary, 2013
Kolaudacja, documentary, 2014
Ostatnia rodzina (The Last Family), 2016
Król (The King), TV series, 2020
Żeby nie było śladów (Leave No Traces), 2021

See also
Polish cinema

References

1984 births
Living people
Polish film directors
Krzysztof Kieślowski Film School alumni
People from Katowice